Tanzeem-e-Islami is an Islamic organisation that advocates the implementation of the Quran and Sunnah in the social, cultural, legal, political, and the economic spheres of life; and the "refutation of the misleading thoughts and philosophy of modernity".

The organization was formed by author and Islamic scholar Israr Ahmed in 1975 following his break with the Jamaat-e-Islami (JI) party in 1957, after the JI entered electoral politics in Pakistan.

Tanzeem-e-Islami has emerged as a "strong conservative force" within Pakistan. It opposes the development of a "modern secular curriculum" in universities, "friendly relations with the United States", and the influx of "Western values and vices" into Pakistan. While it supports jihad, it emphasizes the need for "passive resistance and perseverance", to first gain a "substantial foothold" and build momentum in society. While primarily active in Pakistan, TI has developed "affiliates based in the Indo-Pakistani Muslim communities in North America and Europe".

History
Tanzeem-e-Islami was founded in 1975. When the TI was founded, it was a traditional Islamic organization. The founder, Israr Ahmed, shared his views on the Quran and Sunnah with supporters of the TI. The TI initially had only a few supporters. The influence of the Tanzeem-e-Islami only increased after the coup of July 5, 1977 by the Pakistani Chief of Staff Muhammad Zia-ul-Haq.

Israr Ahmed's first television show was called "Al-Kitab" and was broadcast during Ramadan 1978. Ahmed's other television programs were "Allf Lam Meem", "Rasul Kamil", "Umm ul Kitab" and "Al-Huda". These TV shows were broadcast across Pakistan. Pakistani President Zia-ul-Haq campaigned for Israr Ahmed to receive a weekly program on state television PTV. Ahmed's television show was one of the first in which an Islamic clergyman gave lessons about Islam. Israr Ahmed complained that, in his opinion, there were too few women wearing headscarves in the audience of his show. Zia-ul-Haq instructed the Ministry of Broadcasting that newscasters should only use subtle make-up on television. In 1983, Israr Ahmed spoke out in favor of establishing a worldwide Caliphate. He surprised the audience with controversial statements about cricket in Pakistan.

The episode with the statement about the cricket games was not broadcast on TV and his show was temporarily suspended. Israr Ahmed protested. However, he did not lose his following.

In 1975, 103 people attended its first event. Of these, 62 joined the Tanseem-e-Islami. In 1992 the TI had 1,778 members and a further 234 members in the Middle East. The women's department at TI was founded in 1983. In 1990 it had 122 members.

The TI had two locations in 1994, one in Sakkar and one in Islamabad and two international locations, one in Toronto and one in Chicago.

The TI operates madrasa in Karachi, Lahore and Multan.

In 2013, the TI called for a boycott of Valentine's Day and put up posters all over Pakistan.

In 2016, the Pakistani authorities instructed the TI to cease efforts to establish a worldwide caliphate.

The Ameers

Dr Israr Ahmed (1975–2002) 
Dr Israr Ahmed, founded Tanzeem-e-Islami in April 1975. He was the Ameer of Tanzeem till 2002, due to serious complications of his health he requested the Majlis-e-Shura of Tanzeem-e-Islami to choose another Ameer and resign from the Amarat of Tanzeem.

Hafiz Akif Saeed (2002–2020) 
Hafiz Akif Saeed, was the second Ameer and the second son of Israr Ahmed. He was the Ameer of Tanzeem till 8 August 2020. Due to serious health issues he requested the Majlis-e-Shura to choose another Ameer and resign from the Amarat of Tanzeem.

Shujauddin Sheikh (2020–present) 
After a process of consultations initiated by Aakif Saeed on the issue of the future Imaarat of Tanzeem-e-Islami, Mohtaram Shujauddin Shaikh’s name came to the forefront in the Majlis-e-Shura of Tanzeem-e-Islami held on 8 August 2020. He was appointed as the new Ameer of Tanzeem-e-Islami on the same day by a majority decision of the Majlis-e-Shura.

See also
Jamaat-e-Islami Pakistan
Majlis-e-Ahrar-e-Islam

References

External links
 www.tanzeem.org
 www.quranacademy.com
 www.drisrarahmed.com
https://www.youtube.com/user/bestofdrisrar
https://www.youtube.com/user/tanzeemorg

Pan-Islamism
Jamaat-e-Islami Pakistan
1975 establishments in Pakistan
Organizations established in 1975
Islamic organisations based in Pakistan
Tanzeem-e-Islami